ISO 3166-2:MA is the entry for Morocco in ISO 3166-2, part of the ISO 3166 standard published by the International Organization for Standardization (ISO), which defines codes for the names of the principal subdivisions (e.g., provinces or states) of all countries coded in ISO 3166-1.

Currently for Morocco, ISO 3166-2 codes are defined for two levels of subdivisions:
 12 regions
 62 provinces and 13 prefectures

Each code consists of two parts, separated by a hyphen. The second part is either of the following:
 two digits (01–12): regions
 three letters: provinces and prefectures

The codes for the regions are assigned roughly from north to south.

Current codes
Subdivision names are listed as in the ISO 3166-2 standard published by the ISO 3166 Maintenance Agency (ISO 3166/MA).

Click on the button in the header to sort each column.

Regions

Provinces and prefectures

Subdivisions located in Western Sahara
The following regions, provinces and prefectures are located in the disputed territory of Western Sahara:
 Dakhla-Oued Ed-Dahab (entirely in Western Sahara) 
 Aousserd (entirely in Western Sahara) 
 Oued Ed-Dahab (entirely in Western Sahara) 
 Guelmim-Oued Noun (partially in Western Sahara) 
 Assa-Zag (partially in Western Sahara) 
 Tan-Tan (partially in Western Sahara) 
 Laâyoune-Sakia El Hamra (partially in Western Sahara)
 Boujdour (entirely in Western Sahara) 
 Es-Semara (partially in Western Sahara) 
 Laâyoune (entirely in Western Sahara)
 Tarfaya (partially in Western Sahara)

Changes
The following changes to the entry have been announced by the ISO 3166/MA since the first publication of ISO 3166-2 in 1998:

Codes before Newsletter I-2

See also
 FIPS region codes of Morocco
 Subdivisions of Morocco

External links
 ISO Online Browsing Platform: MA
 Regions of Morocco, Statoids.com
 Prefectures of Morocco, Statoids.com

2:MA
ISO 3166-2
ISO 3166-2
Morocco geography-related lists